The saker falcon (Falco cherrug) is a large species of falcon. This species breeds from central Europe eastwards across the Palearctic to Manchuria. It is mainly migratory except in the southernmost parts of its range, wintering in Ethiopia, the Arabian peninsula, northern Pakistan and western China. The saker falcon is the second fastest bird in level flight after the white-throated needletail swift, capable of reaching 150 km/h
(93 mph). It is also the 3rd fastest animal in the world overall after the peregrine falcon and the golden eagle, with all three species capable of executing high speed dives known as “swooping”, in excess of 320 km/h (200 mph). The saker falcon is the national bird of Hungary, the United Arab Emirates, and Mongolia.

Taxonomy and systematics
This species belongs to the close-knit hierofalcon complex. In this group, there is ample evidence for rampant hybridization and incomplete lineage sorting which confounds analyses of DNA sequence data to a massive extent; molecular studies with small sample sizes can simply not be expected to yield reliable conclusions in the entire hierofalcon group. The radiation of the entire living diversity of hierofalcons seems to have taken place in the Eemian interglacial at the start of the Late Pleistocene, a mere 130,000–115,000 years ago; the saker falcon represents a lineage that expanded out of northeastern Africa into the interior of southeastern Europe and Asia, by way of the eastern Mediterranean region.

In captivity, lanners and sakers can interbreed, and gyrfalcon-saker hybrids are also available (see bird flu experiment described in "Ecology and status").
The specific name, cherrug, comes from the Sindhi name charg for a female saker. The common name saker comes from the  meaning "falcon".

Saker falcons at the northeast edge of the range in the Altai Mountains are slightly larger, and darker and more heavily spotted on the underparts than other populations. These, known as the Altai falcon, have been treated in the past either as a distinct species "Falco altaicus" or as a hybrid between saker falcon and gyrfalcon, but modern opinion (e.g. ) is to tentatively treat it as a form of saker falcon, until comprehensive studies of its population genetics and ecology are available.

Description
It resembles a larger but browner gyrfalcon. It is larger and more heavily built than the related lanner falcon.

Saker falcons tend to have variable plumage. Males and females are similar, except in size, as are young birds, although these tend to be darker and more heavily streaked. The call is a sharp kiy-ee or a repeated kyak-kyak-kyak.

Ecology
The saker falcon is a raptor of open grasslands preferably with some trees or cliffs. It often hunts by horizontal pursuit, rather than the peregrine's stoop from a height, and feeds mainly on rodents and birds. In Europe, ground squirrels and feral pigeons are the most common prey items. This species usually builds no nest of own, but lays its 3–6 eggs in an old stick nest in a tree which was previously used by other birds such as storks, ravens or buzzards. It also often nests on cliffs.

Saker nests support a species-rich assemblage of commensal insects.

Status and conservation
BirdLife International categorises this bird as endangered, due to a rapid population decline, particularly on the central Asian breeding grounds. Ever since the collapse of the Soviet Union, the United Arab Emirates have been the main destination for thousands of falcons caught and sold illegally for hefty sums at the black market. Kazakhstan is estimated to lose up to 1,000 saker falcons per year.

The species also faces pressure from habitat loss and destruction. The population was estimated to be between 7,200 and 8,800 mature individuals in 2004. However, sakers live at low densities across large ranges in remote regions, making distribution status difficult to assess. A climatic niche modelling study pinpointed certain remote areas for targeted population surveys. In the United States, Canada and Europe there are several captive breeding projects. The most dramatic decline of the saker falcon in Asia has been in Kazakhstan and Uzbekistan. In contrast, a strongly protected and relatively abundant population persists in Hungary.

Saker falcons are known to be very susceptible to avian influenza, individuals having been found infected with highly pathogenic H5N1 (in Saudi Arabia) and H7N7 (in Italy) strains. Therefore, an experiment was done with hybrid gyr-saker falcons, which found that five falcons vaccinated with a commercial H5N2 influenza vaccine survived infection with a highly pathogenic H5N1 strain, whereas five unvaccinated falcons died. This means that sakers could be protected from bird flu by vaccination, at least in captivity.

In culture

A Hungarian mythological bird, the Turul, was probably a saker falcon (kerecsensólyom), and the saker falcon is the national bird of Hungary. In 2012, the saker falcon was selected as the national bird of Mongolia.

Use in falconry
The saker falcon has been used in falconry for thousands of years, and like its very close relative, the gyrfalcon, is a highly regarded in it. Swift and powerful, it is effective against medium and large game bird species. Saker falcons can reach speeds of 120 to 150 km/h and suddenly swoop down on their prey. In recent years it is possible that hybrids of the saker falcon and peregrine falcon have been developed in order to provide falconers a bird with greater size and horizontal speed than the peregrine, with greater propensity for diving stoops on game than the saker.

References

External links

 saker.sciencefornature.org
 
 Live 24hr view of a saker falcon nest
 
 
 
 
 Saker Falcon Falco cherrug Global Action Plan (SakerGAP)

saker falcon
Birds of Africa
Birds of Central Asia
Birds of Mongolia
Birds of prey of Eurasia
Birds of the Arabian Peninsula
Birds of China
Birds of Pakistan
saker falcon
Falconry
saker falcon